Arora Akanksha (born July 31, 1986) is an Indo-Canadian auditor and United Nations staff member. She is an audit coordinator for the United Nations Development Programme. In February 2021, she announced her intention to challenge incumbent UN Secretary-General António Guterres in the 2021 United Nations leadership selection. However, she was never nominated by a member state, and so her candidacy was never considered by the United Nations Security Council.

Early life

Arora's grandparents came to India as refugees from Pakistan after the Partition of India in 1947. She was born in the Indian state of Haryana and moved to Saudi Arabia at age six. From age 9 to 18, she attended boarding school in India.

Education and career

Arora studied administrative studies at York University in Toronto, Canada. After graduating, she was an auditing manager at PricewaterhouseCoopers Canada. In December 2016, she joined the United Nations. She is an audit coordinator at the United Nations Development Programme.

While working at the UN, she studied public administration as a graduate student at Columbia University.

Candidacy for UN Secretary-General

On February 17, 2021, Arora declared her intention to run for the position of United Nations Secretary-General, saying "We are not living up to our purpose or our promise. We are failing those we are here to serve." She believes that the UN is wasteful and paternalistic, and that the organisation is not accomplishing its mission. She has taken a leave of absence from her work as a UN auditor to work on the campaign, which she describes as a "David and Goliath story".

Former UN official Edward Mortimer said of her candidacy, "I'm sure she has no chance, and equally sure that she knows that", but that her campaign was a way to show her dissatisfaction with how the UN operates. Former UN High Commissioner for Human Rights Mary Robinson said she shared many of Arora's concerns.

In order to be eligible for selection, Arora must be nominated by at least one member state. She reached out to all 193 U.N. member states, and heard back from only 10 of them. She summarizes these responses by saying these countries were "fearful of nominating me because of retaliation from members of the Security Council and the European Union". Arora met with her home country's permanent representative to the United Nations, Bob Rae, on March 15, 2021, but she has not heard back from him or Canada since then.

Incumbent António Guterres was re-elected by acclamation for a second term at the helm of the United Nations in June 2021.

Notes

References

External links
 

United Nations officials
School of International and Public Affairs, Columbia University alumni
Punjabi people
Punjabi Hindus
Indian emigrants to Canada
Canadian people of Indian descent
Canadian people of Punjabi descent
Canadian Hindus
Canadian auditors
Living people
1986 births
York University alumni